Kantora District is one of the four districts of the Upper River Division of the Gambia. it is the easternmost district of the country

At one point Kantora was a province of the Kabu Empire but it probably had different boundaries then. The name derives from the Mandinka phrase "kana-ntoro," meaning "do not trouble me," referring to the disputes that Tiramakhan Traore's expedition struggled with there. They founded the village of Songkunda, meaning "place of agreement," to commemorate the re-establishment of peace. The name of the area is first recorded from 1456.

References

Upper River Division
Districts of the Gambia